Lockheart is a surname of British origin, which is a variant of the more common surname Lockhart. Lockheart may refer to:

Julia Lockheart, British artist and academic (writing in art and design)
Lucy Lockheart, fictional character in the British television series Footballers' Wives
Mark Lockheart (born 1961), British saxophonist

See also
 Lockhart (disambiguation)

Surnames of British Isles origin
Surnames of English origin
English-language surnames